Dhok Gujran is a landfill near Rawalpindi, Pakistan.  Previously a solid waste disposal area where about 800 tonnes a day of solid waste from Rawalpindi and Islamabad had been disposed off there. Due to serious health risk problems the people around the place faced, waste disposal area was relocated from here and about 1.5 million tons previous waste disposed off using a mobile solid waste management plant.

Landfills